Transmethylation is a biologically important organic chemical reaction in which a methyl group is transferred from one compound to another.

An example of transmethylation is the recovery of methionine from homocysteine. In order to sustain sufficient reaction rates during metabolic stress, this reaction requires adequate levels of vitamin B12 and folate. Methyl tetrahydrofolate delivers methyl groups to form the active methyl form of vitamin B12 that is required for methylation of homocysteine. Deficiencies of vitamin B12 or folate cause increased levels of circulating homocysteine. Elevated homocysteine is a risk factor for cardiovascular disease and is linked to the metabolic syndrome (insulin insensitivity).

Transmethylation is decreased sometimes in parents of children with autism.

See also 
Methylation

References 

Organic reactions

de:Transmethylierung